The  is a Japanese automotive and motorcycle parts company headquartered in Shinjuku, Tokyo, Japan. The company is a major supplier to Honda, who owns nearly half of Keihin's shares, but also supplies other motorcycle manufacturers, among them Triumph, Suzuki, Kawasaki, KTM, Royal Enfield and Harley-Davidson. In addition to carburetors, Keihin supplies the automotive industry with engine, transmission, and climate control products, including intake manifold assemblies, HVAC assemblies, compressors, valves, solenoids, and engine control units.

History 
Keihin was founded in 1956 and began U.S. manufacturing in 1989. Counting all U.S. locations, Keihin has more than 20,000 employees. Keihin North America's corporate headquarters is in Anderson, Indiana.

References

External links
 Keihin Corporation website  

Auto parts suppliers of Japan
Automotive companies based in Tokyo
Manufacturing companies based in Tokyo
Companies listed on the Tokyo Stock Exchange
Manufacturing companies established in 1956
Engine fuel system technology
Japanese brands
Carburetor manufacturers
Honda
Japanese companies established in 1956